This is a list of the Italian Ministers of Transport. The list shows also the ministers that served under the same office but with other names, in fact this Ministry has changed name many times.

List of Ministers
 Parties
1946-1994:

Since 1994:

Minister of Transport
Ministers of Transport
Transport